Lego City Undercover is an action-adventure video game developed by TT Fusion and published by Nintendo for the Wii U in 2013. It was later re-released for Nintendo Switch, PlayStation 4, Windows via Steam, and Xbox One by Warner Bros. Interactive Entertainment in 2017. Based on the City themed toyline by Lego, the narrative follows cop Chase McCain as he returns to Lego City and pursues escaped crime boss Rex Fury. Gameplay features McCain both exploring the open world hub of Lego City, and completing self-contained levels featuring puzzles and combat. The original version was single-player only, while the re-release added local two-player multiplayer.

The first prototypes for Lego City Undercover were produced in 2010, with development beginning in 2011 after Nintendo approached parent company TT Games about developing for the Wii U. At the time production began, it was to be the first title featuring voice acting, and it was the first in the TT Games Lego series not to rely on a movie or comic license. The script, written by Graham Goring, made extensive use of parody and reference to both crime shows, and other movies and television series. The Lego City hub was based on multiple real locations.

The game was originally announced in 2011 as Lego City Stories for Wii U and Nintendo 3DS. The 3DS version was a standalone prequel, Lego City Undercover: The Chase Begins. The game received positive reviews for its story, humour, and evolved gameplay formula. Criticism focused on the lack of co-op options and long loading times. The original Wii U version had sold over one million copies worldwide as of 2019.

Gameplay 
Taking place in the vast Lego City, players control an undercover cop named Chase McCain. Chase goes on the hunt for criminals, with various moves at his disposal, such as swinging across poles and performing wall jumps. He can also gain disguises that give him additional abilities, such as a robber disguise that lets him break locks. Chase can also pilot vehicles, such as cars and helicopters, and use loose bricks to build various objects. Other characters can be playable once unlocked, but they'll still talk with Chase's voice (except in cutscenes where Chase can still be seen). Players can also create custom characters, which are also playable. The Wii U GamePad can be used as a device including a communicator and as a scanner to locate criminals.

Lego City Undercover'''s gameplay borrows heavily from the Grand Theft Auto series. However the game is role-reversed with the player taking on the role of a police officer enforcing the law, rather than a criminal committing crime, although the player is occasionally required to commit criminal acts on some occasions, like dealing with shady businesses and committing robbery at the museum, in order to infiltrate criminal gangs.

 Plot 
Police officer Chase McCain returns to Lego City after being exiled 2 years prior, where he learns from Mayor Gleeson that Rex Fury - a notorious criminal that Chase helped to arrest - had recently escaped from prison and asks Chase to find him and stop him once again. To assist him in his work, Chase is joined by dim-witted rookie Frank Honey, and assisted by police technician Ellie Phillips, though his return is not welcome news for Natalia Kowalski (Jules de Jongh), Chase's ex-girlfriend, who was forced into the witness protection program after he inadvertently revealed her as the witness in Fury's trial, nor Marion Dunby (Kerry Shale), the city's new Chief of Police, who had Chase sent away because of his mistake as well as always having a giant dislike to him.

After helping to deal with a number of minor cases and finding clues in Rex's prison cell, Chase manages to gain a few clues that lead him to encountering Rex at Bluebell Mine. Despite finding him, he is defeated before he can arrest him, and upon regaining consciousness, he learns that Natalia's father has gone missing. Chase offers to help her find him but Natalia refuses. Chase then goes to a dojo/plumbing business and gets basic kung fu training from a plumber/martial artist named Barry Smith (Adam Buxton). Afterwards, he is sent to save Frank and a new state-of-the-art police truck (the M.O.V.) from criminal associates' of Rex. Frank drives the police truck and eventually crashes into the station during a ceremony with Gleeson and Dunby. After being pressured by Gleeson to involve Chase in Rex's case, upon Frank informing her that he is being purposely kept out of it, Dunby sends Chase undercover within a limousine company owned by Chan Chuang, head of a crime gang. During his time in the company, he works as a driver for millionaire Forrest Blackwell (Peter Serafinowicz), gains acceptance with Chan's business partner, Vinnie Pappalardo (John Guerrasio), and steals a moon buggy for Chan. When Natalia is captured by Chan, while investigating his connection to her father's disappearance, Chase goes to rescue her, causing her to accept his help in finding her father, but angering Dunby when Chan goes into hiding.

Dunby temporarily removes him from the case, and has Chase and Frank transferred to Bluebell National Park to work with Ellie's uncle Sheriff Duke Huckleberry. Sometime later, Dunby reinstates him to the case, whereupon Chase is tasked by Vinnie to taking on work for him, including the job of stealing a robotic T-Rex from the Lego City museum. After helping to rescue Natalia from a group of mysterious men, whereupon they partially reconcile, Chase tails Vinnie to his private buyer and finds it to be Rex himself. When Vinnie learns he won't be paid for his work and is ordered to steal more items for his buyer, he instructs Chase to steal from Blackwell. After breaking into his mansion but failed to secure any valuables due to being pursued by Blackwell's security forces, Chase returns to Vinne's ice cream parlor, only to find it overrun by Rex's thugs and Vinnie locked in a freezer in retaliation for going against Rex's orders. Chase manages to save Vinnie from Rex's thugs, and after interrogating the thug's leader, takes their place to learn what Rex is planning.

Managing to infiltrate Rex's hideout, Chase overhears Natalia's father, lunar scientist Henrik Kowalski, being interrogated by Rex and discovers that Blackwell himself organized the crime wave, and had managed to kidnap Natalia to coerce her father to work on his plans. Rescuing Kowalski, Chase calls Ellie with what he learnt, whereupon she informs him that Blackwell recently was in the news with promises he had plans that would change Lego City forever. Proceeding to Blackwell's mansion, he searches it for evidence of Blackwell's crimes and to locate Natalia. Chase soon discovers that Blackwell originally had plans to build an apartment complex and shopping mall in Bluebell, but was stopped by Lego City from building due to a rare and endangered squirrel species in the park. Humiliated and enraged at being denied, Blackwell began a new plan to build a colony on the moon and converted his high-rise, Blackwell Tower, into a rocket, which Chase discovers will burn Lego City when it's launched. Chase quickly has Henry and several members in the police department build a force field to prevent the rocket's engines from destroying the city.

Learning that Blackwell still had Natalia with him, Chase chases him via a space shuttle. Upon landing on the moon, Chase finds himself using a construction mech to battle against Rex within the modified T-Rex he helped to steal. Blackwell leaves both men behind, destroying the shuttle. Chase manages to defeat Rex in a final battle, whereupon Blackwell sends both into free fall towards Earth. Vowing for revenge, Blackwell finds himself sent flying away by a cow out of nowhere. Skydiving towards Natalia's prison within the rocket's command module, Chase rescues her by triggering the module's parachute. Once back in the city, Gleeson congratulates him for saving Lego City, while Dunby offers Chase the honor of overseeing Rex's arrest. However, Chase turns it down, claiming Natalia is more important to him now, and they rekindle their relationship and leave to start a new life together.

Bonus missions
If the code from the High speed chase Lego set is used (or if the game is completed in the remastered version) there are two bonus missions located at the police station that depict a police chase from two points of view. One mission allows the player to steal a car from the station and drive it to a criminal hideout. The other is the same scenario, only the player controls the cop who pursues the criminal and eventually arrests him.

 Development 
The development team at TT Fusion had been wanting to create a video game based on the Lego City theme for some time, but the available technology and the fact that most staff were working on existing IPs limited their ability to create such a game. Prototyping for what would become Lego City Undercover began in 2010, and lasted roughly twelve months. As they did not have a solid idea of what the game would be, the team began with creating a small environment with drivable vehicles and Lego buildings. In 2011, Nintendo approached the company and showed them the Wii U hardware, asking whether they would like to develop a game for it. Having already had good experiences with Nintendo with successful ports of their previous titles and liking the platform's specs, the team agreed to work with Nintendo. Developing a game not tied to a movie license gave the team a degree of freedom previously unavailable, while also presenting difficulties with multiple aspects including the story, gameplay and general mechanics of the game. Due to the high compatibility between the team's concept and its prospective hardware, ports to other consoles were not seriously considered, until a few years after the game was released. They were also able to integrate the GamePad functions into the game, making part of Undercovers world. Nintendo generally left the team to develop the game as they pleased, though they received regular updates on the project and would notify them if they saw anything as a problem. One of the early gameplay challenges was the combat, which needed to fit into the story context of the lead character being a policeman. Instead of a simple brawling style, the team designed the battle system to allow for defensive gameplay and not involve an equivalent to lethal take-downs.

While designing the setting, the team used elements from multiple locations, including New York City, San Francisco and London. As the game was being developed for a Nintendo console, the team included multiple Nintendo-themed Easter eggs for players to find. The team had to create a new game engine as previous ones were not able to cope with the scale of the environments. They also wanted the main character, Chase McCain, to have depth as they knew both children and adults would play the game. Undercover features full voice acting, which at the time development started was a first for the series, although due to development time, others featuring voice acting were developed and released ahead of it. For the voice casting, the team used voice casting and recording company Side UK. A large voice casting session was held, and several established comedians were specifically asked to come in as the team wanted good delivery for the funny sections of the script. By the time the script writer, former stand-up comedian Graham Goring, was brought on board, a rough outline of the story had been created. His main role was to fill in the gaps and put in as much humor as possible. Goring was given a lot of freedom when it came to the parodies, although the team were regularly consulted on the suitability of the material and a script editor was assigned to check his work. Drawing on his former profession, Goring included a large amount of one-liners and humor intended for both children and adults. Following the template of The Simpsons, the game contains a high number of family-friendly parodies, referencing movies such as The Shawshank Redemption and The Matrix, and TV series such as Starsky & Hutch. The game's story took a while to write, as the team wanted to give it depth.Lego City Undercover was announced during Nintendo's press conference at E3 2011 on 7 June 2011 under the tentative title Lego City Stories. At Nintendo's press conference at E3 2012 on 5 June 2012, the game was revealed to have had a name change to Lego City Undercover. It is the first Lego title published by Nintendo. The game's debut trailer was shown during that event, revealing game footage for the first time. During the Nintendo Direct held on 13 September 2012, some new trailers detailing the story were shown, along with the announcement that a Chase McCain minifigure would come with the game as a pre-order bonus on North America and Australia while stocks last, and be included in the first copies of the game on Europe. A police high speed chase toy was also released and includes a code for additional in-game content. Nintendo also published the game in Japan on 25 July 2013.

On 22 November 2016, Warner Bros. Interactive Entertainment announced that a remaster would be released for Nintendo Switch, PlayStation 4, Windows, and Xbox One in April 2017, which introduced split-screen cooperative support.

 Reception 

The Wii U version of the game received a score of 80/100 on review aggregator website Metacritic, indicating “generally favorable reviews”. Reviews were largely positive, praising the humour and design, but generally criticizing lengthy loading times and a lack of co-operative multiplayer, the latter of which is a staple in most Lego titles. Official Nintendo Magazine awarded the game 90%, making it the magazine's third highest rated Wii U game at the time. IGN gave the game 8 out 10, praising its huge open world while criticising its generic gameplay. Eurogamer gave the game a score of 9 out of 10, saying the game features "a mixture of great writing, twinkling level design and laudable values that keep you coming back". GamesRadar gave the game 4 out of 5 stars, praising the inventive use of occupations and rewarding puzzles but criticising the lack of co-operative multiplayer. GameTrailers gave the game a score of 8.4, calling it "the best game in the series so far." Nintendo Insider awarded the game a score of 85%, writing that it "signals a bold new direction for TT Fusion’s creativity."

 Sales 
According to NPD figures, the game sold more than 100,000 units in the United States in its debut month, debuting outside the top 10 and tying with Monster Hunter 3 Ultimate''. In the UK, the game debuted at number 12 in the all-formats chart, however, it debuted at number 8 in the individual-format chart and at number 1 in the Wii U chart. In Japan, the game sold more than 18,000 copies during its first week, entering all the charts at number 9. By December 2019, the Wii U version had sold 1.9 million units worldwide.

References

External links 
 

2013 video games
City Undercover
Undercover
Nintendo games
Nintendo Network games
Nintendo Switch games
Open-world video games
Split-screen multiplayer games
Organized crime video games
PlayStation 4 games
Traveller's Tales games
Video games about police officers
Video games developed in the United Kingdom
Warner Bros. video games
Wii U eShop games
Wii U games
Windows games
Xbox One games
3D platform games
Video games set in 2013
Pack-in video games
Multiplayer and single-player video games
Video games set on the Moon